Ignatius Behnam Hadloyo was the Patriarch of Antioch and head of the Syriac Orthodox Church from 1445 until his death in 1454.

Biography
Behnam was born at Ḥadl in Tur Abdin in the 14th century, and was the son of John of the Habbo Kanni family, who were originally from Bartella in the Nineveh Plains. Other prominent members of the family include the deacon and physician Behnam ( 1293), son of the priest Mubarak, and the writer Abu Nasr, abbot of the monastery of Saint Matthew. 

He became a monk at the monastery of Qartmin and was later ordained as a priest. Behnam was consecrated as maphrian in 1404, and assumed the name Basil. As maphrian, he may have resided at the monastery of Saint Matthew near Mosul for the entirety of the duration of his episcopate or only for intervals. He was elected as the successor of Ignatius Abraham bar Gharib as patriarch of Mardin at a synod at the monastery of Saint Ananias and was consecrated on 24 June or July 1412 by Dioscorus Behnam Shatti, archbishop of the monastery of Saint Malke, upon which he assumed the name Ignatius.

As patriarch, Behnam engaged with the Catholic Church and despatched Abdallah, archbishop of Edessa, as his representative to the Council of Florence. It is suggested that this was likely after Behnam had received an invitation from a delegation of Franciscan envoys on behalf of Pope Eugene IV. Upon the success of negotiations between Abdallah and a number of cardinals and theologians, union between the two churches was agreed and celebrated at the Lateran Palace at Rome on 30 September 1444 with the declaration of the papal bull Multa et Admirabilia.

After the death of the Patriarch Basil IV Simon in 1445, Behnam travelled to Jerusalem to prevent the election of a successor so to heal the schism between the rival patriarchates of Antioch and Mardin that had endured since 1293. He successfully convinced the bishops formerly under Basil IV to acclaim him as patriarch of Antioch, thus restoring unity to the church under his authority. In the aftermath of the fall of Constantinople to the Ottoman Empire in 1453, relations with the Catholic Church became untenable, and consequently Behnam's union as signed in 1444 was renounced. He served as patriarch of Antioch until his death on 10 December 1454, and was buried at the monastery of Saint Ananias.

Works
Behnam wrote ten books of propitiatory prayers (pl. ), of which, three were for Lent, four for the festivals of the saints Asya, Abhai, Barsohde, and Saba, whilst others were on the Presentation of Jesus at the Temple and the morning of the festival of our Lady over the crops. He also wrote an anaphora and prepared a compilation of selections from Daniel of Salah's commentary on the Psalms, dated 1425 (ms. Jerusalem, St. Mark 14). In addition, Behnam wrote eleven poems.

References

Notes

Citations

Bibliography

Syriac Patriarchs of Antioch from 512 to 1783
Year of birth unknown
1454 deaths
Syriac writers
15th-century Oriental Orthodox archbishops
Patriarchs of Mardin
Maphrians
14th-century writers
14th-century births
15th-century writers